Irene Komnene Laskarina Branaina (died around 1271) was a Byzantine noblewoman and wife of sebastokrator Constantine Palaiologos, half-brother of Byzantine Emperor Michael VIII Palaiologos. She seems to have followed suit after her husband's retirement to a convent, and taken the monastic name of Maria. She probably died as a nun.

Marriage and family 

Irene was the granddaughter of Byzantine General Theodore Branas and Agnes of France, though the Branas genealogy is poorly recorded.

Irene was married c. 1259/60 to Constantine Palaiologos, by whom he seems to have had five children"

 Michael Komnenos Branas Palaiologos
 Andronikos Branas Doukas Angelos Palaiologos
 Maria Komnene Branaina Laskarina Doukaina Tornikina Palaiologina. Married Isaac Komnenos Doukas Tornikios.
 Theodora. Married John Komnenos Doukas Angelos Synadenos and had three children. Later became a nun under the name Theodoule.
 Daughter (name unknown). Married Smilets of Bulgaria.

Footnotes

References 

 Bekker, I. (ed.) (1835) Georgii Pachymeris De Michaele et Andronico Palaeologis, Corpus Scriptorum Historiæ Byzantinæ (Bonn) Vol I, De Michaele Palaeologo, Liber II, 5, p. 97.
 George Pachymeres, De Michaele Palaeologo & Andronicus Palæologus
 George Acropolites, Annals

 Hooper, N. & Bennett, M., The Cambridge Illustrated Atlas of Warfare (Cambridge University Press, 1996) , 
 
 'Typikon of Theodora Synadene for the Convent of the Mother of God Bebaia Elpis in Constantinople' (trans. Alice-Mary Talbot), from Byzantine Monastic Foundation Documents: A Complete Translation of the Surviving Founder's Typika and Testaments, Thomas, J. & Hero, A.C. (eds.) (Dumbarton Oaks Research Library and Collection, Washington D.C. 2000)
 Guillaume Saint-Guillain, Identities and Allegiances in the Eastern Mediterranean after 1204 (Routledge, 2016) , 

13th-century Byzantine people
13th-century births
1270s deaths
People of the Empire of Nicaea